Caplyn is a surname. Notable people with the surname include:

 John Caplyn (disambiguation)
Nicholas Caplyn, MP for Southampton (UK Parliament constituency)